A ducat is a Middle Ages European trade coin.

Ducat or variation, may also refer to:

 Ducat (surname)
 Ducat, Ohio, US, an unincorporated community
 DUCAT, an ISP in Kazakhstan; see Internet in Kazakhstan
 Ducat Auction House, founded by Leonid Komskyi
 Ducats, an in-game internet currency for Playchess
 Orokin Ducats, an in-game currency in Warframe

See also

 Dukat (disambiguation)
 Ducato
 Ducati (disambiguation)